The 1891 British Isles tour to South Africa was the first British Isles rugby union tour of South Africa and only the second overseas tour conducted by a joint British team. Between 9 July and 7 September, the team played 20 games, including three Tests against the South Africa national rugby union team. The British Isles not only won all three Test matches, but also won all 17 provincial games. Although not named as such at the time, the tour is retrospectively recognised as a British Lions tour.

Tour details

After the South African Rugby Board was formed in 1889, the committee decided one of the best ways to promote the game was to invite a British side to visit, similar to the British Isles tour of Australia and New Zealand in 1888. In September 1890 the Rugby Football Union (RFU) discussed the proposed tour; in attendance was Mr J Richards of Cape Town, who, as an Old Leysian, had connections to the English game. The tour was agreed, with Cecil Rhodes agreeing to guarantee any financial losses the tour may incur.

The first overseas British tour of 1888, was not sanctioned by the RFU, and therefore is often not recognised as an official Lions tour, so the South African Tests were actually the first matches that allowed the British players to be awarded international caps.

Captained by Scottish international Bill Maclagan, the British team consisted of players from English and Scottish clubs with a heavy contingent of members from Cambridge University teams. Of the players roughly half were, or would win national caps, and the majority of those who did not were former Cambridge Blues. Although containing four Scots, the fact that the tour was organised by the RFU, the team was initially recognised as an English team, but retrospectively gained its British Isles tag. The touring party had been selected by a committee composed of George Rowland Hill, the president of the RFU, R.S. Whalley, Harry Vassall, Arthur Budd and J.H.S. McArthur.

The British team took in twenty matches, three of them tests against the South African team. The tourists won all twenty matches conceding just a single try, which was scored against them in the very first game. Although the Test top scorer for the tourists was Arthur Rotherham, mainly because a conversion at the time was worth twice as much as a try; the tour's outstanding scorer was Randolph Aston. At six-foot three, and weighing 15 stones, Aston played in all 20 matches and was the unstoppable try scorer of the tour. Out of the 89 tries scored by the British team, Aston scored 30 including the first try against the South African team in the first Test.

The tourists played in red and white hooped shirts and dark blue shorts.

Touring party
 Manager: Edwin Ash

Full Backs
 William Grant Mitchell (Cambridge University and Richmond)
 Edward Bromet (Cambridge University)

Three-Quarters
 Paul Robert Clauss (Oxford University and )
 Randolph Aston (Cambridge University)
 Bill Maclagan (London Scottish and ) (captain)

Half backs
 Howard Marshall (Sunderland FC & Blackheath FC)
 B.G. Roscoe (Lancashire)
 Arthur Rotherham (Cambridge University)
 William Wotherspoon (Cambridge University and )

Forwards
 William Bromet (Oxford University)
 John Harding Gould (Old Leysians)
 Johnny Hammond (Cambridge University)
 Froude Hancock (Somerset)
 Walter Jesse Jackson (Gloucester)
 Robert MacMillan (London Scottish and )
 Edwin Mayfield (Cambridge University)
 Clement Pearson Simpson (Cambridge University)
 Aubone Surtees (Cambridge University)
 Robert Thompson (Cambridge University)
 William Henry Thorman (Cambridge University)
 Thomas Sherren Whittaker (Lancashire)

Results
Complete list of matches played by the British Isles in South Africa: 

 Test matches

Match details

First test

Second test

Third test

Bibliography

References

British & Irish Lions tours of South Africa
British Lions Tour To South Africa, 1891
British Lions